Grala ( is a Polish-language surname. It is derived from the Polish verb grać "to play", and literally is a nickname for a musician, "the one who plays". Notable people with the surname include:
Darius Grala (born 1964), Polish racing driver
 (born 1957), Polish historian and diplomat
Kaz Grala (born 1998),  American stock car racing driver
 (born 1954), Polish poet

Polish-language surnames
Surnames from nicknames